Kim Jun-hyun is a Korean name consisting of the family name Kim and the given name Jun-hyun, and may also refer to:

 Kim Jun-hyun (footballer) (born 1964), South Korean footballer
 Kim Jun-hyun (comedian) (born 1980), South Korean comedian